The Newry, Warrenpoint and Rostrevor Railway (NW&RR) was a former railway line linking Newry and the port of Warrenpoint on the Carlingford Lough inlet in Ireland, and the company operating it.  The railway was absorbed into the Great Northern Railway of Ireland in 1886 and the line closed in 1965.

History
The directors contracted William Dargan to construct the line which was completed in 1.5 years, publicly opening on 28 May 1849.  

The line was not initially connected to any other. At the same time the NW&RR, who had recognised the need to connect to main Irish rail network since 1852, crossed the Newry (Clanrye) River and relocated northern terminus station from Kilmorey Street to Dublin Bridge. In the event following protracted negotiations with the Newry Navigation Company parliamentary permission was granted for the Town of Newry Connecting Railway company to establish the line crossing the Newry Canal, the  link costing £12,700 opening on 2 September 1861, and involving five level crossings.

On 1 August 1876 the Dundalk, Newry and Greencore Railway (DN&GR), backed by the London North Western Railway (LNWR) of England, opened their line to a temporary terminus at Newry Bridge Street, the connection Albert Street and the rest of the Network at Newry only opening 1 July 1800.  The LNWR began their Holyhead to Greenore service on 2 August 1876, and Patterson observes the NW&RR would likely have realised it was then implausible that Warrenpoint, which had never really challenged Newry as a port, would ever establish itself for cross-channel trade.

The enterprise was amalgamated into the GNRI by an act of 4 June 1886. The GNRI provided an improved W. H. Mills-style station building in 1891. The line was transferred to the Ulster Transport Authority on 1 October 1958, with the final train from Warrenpoint running on 2 January 1965.

References

Notes

Footnotes

Sources
 
 
 
 
 
 
 

Closed railways in Northern Ireland
Railway lines opened in 1849
Railway lines closed in 1965
Irish gauge railways